Tilantapara (also written as Tilandapara) is a  village in the Sabang CD block in the Kharagpur subdivision of the Paschim Medinipur district in the state of West Bengal, India.

Geography

Location

Area overview
Kharagpur subdivision, shown partly in the map alongside, mostly has alluvial soils, except in two CD blocks in the west – Kharagpur I and Keshiary, which mostly have lateritic soils. Around 74% of the total cultivated area is cropped more than once. With a density of population of 787 per km2nearly half of the district’s population resides in this subdivision. 14.33% of the population lives in urban areas and 86.67% lives in the rural areas.

Note: The map alongside presents some of the notable locations in the subdivision. All places marked in the map are linked in the larger full screen map.

Demographics
According to the 2011 Census of India, Tilantapara had a total population of 1,593, of which 827 (52%) were males and 766 (48%) were females. There were 155 persons in the age range of 0–6 years. The total number of literate persons in Tilantapara was 3237 (91.96% of the population over 6 years).

.*For language details see Sabang (community development block)#Language and religion

Education
Tilantapara U.M.M. High School is a Bengali-medium co-educational institution established in 1965. It has facilities for teaching from class V to class XII. It has a library with 3,200 books, 3 computers and a playground.

Culture
David J. McCutchion mentions the Janaki Ballava temple as a pancharatna with smooth rekha turrets measuring 30’ square, built in 1810/11. It has a porch on three arches. It has rich terracotta on three sides and stucco on the fourth.

References

Villages in Paschim Medinipur district